New River is a census-designated place (CDP) in Pulaski County, Virginia, United States. The population at the time of the 2010 Census was 244.

A post office was established as New River Depot in 1868. The community took its name from New River upon which it is situated.

References

Virginia Trend Report 2: State and Complete Places (Sub-state 2010 Census Data)

Unincorporated communities in Virginia
Census-designated places in Pulaski County, Virginia
Census-designated places in Virginia